Youth for Exchange and Understanding (YEU) is an International Non-Governmental Non-profit Youth Organisation established in 1986 and member of the European Youth Forum in Brussels. YEU is recognized by the Council of Europe and the Directorate of Youth and Sports of the European Commission. YEU has its Head Office in Brussels, Belgium and a second office in Faro, Portugal from where it coordinates a network with more than 27 member organisations from Europe and North Africa. YEU is a non-profit International Youth Non Governmental Organization (IYNGO) independent of all political affiliation.

The Organisation

History
Youth for Exchange and Understanding was founded on 28 August 1986 in Strasbourg by a group of 120 young people from 11 different countries, a result of 4-year cooperation which started in Germany in 1981 with the first international meeting - Convention (officially said Convention in 1983) with participants from eight nations. Since 1989 it has been a member of the European Coordination Bureau. Today YEU is a member of the European Youth Forum and the Lifelong Learning Platform and it is considered by the Council of Europe and the European Union as an international non-governmental non-profit youth organisation.

Vision
Youth for Exchange and Understanding works to promote peace, understanding and co-operation between the young people of the world, in a spirit of respect for human rights.

Mission
YEU is inclusive network of youth organisations, led by and for young people, promoting importance of active citizenship initiatives by using non-formal education as a tool in order to provide knowledge, skills and intercultural experience for personal and social development.

Structure
YEU is run by youth for youth with a democratic structure headed by a board of directors. It has two offices, the headquarter and administrative office in Brussels and a second office in Faro, Portugal.
There are three main bodies within YEU, the administrative office (AO), the governing board (GB) and the assembly of member organisations (GA).
 The Administrative Office takes care of logistics, project management and coordination and network strategic planning;
 The Governing Board is composed by seven people and is responsible for general and planning and strategy of YEU;
 The General Assembly is held once a year with all full and observer members and it is devoted to GB and AO positions elections and to long-term planning.
Member organisations are youth-led NGOs registered as autonomous entities in their own countries.

Activities
YEU is actively involved in the Erasmus+ framework and works closely with the European Youth Foundation to design and develop projects and events targeted at youth.

 International projects: activities related with the work of YEU held in cooperation with other NGOs and/or partners, ranging from small events to extended cooperations in Horizon 2020 projects;
 International Youth Convention: a two to three-week convention held annually when people can experience life with local families, enjoy communal life in a campsite, and spend one week in a hostel in a city in the hosting country and meet with their peers, usually newcomers in the youth work field;
 Youth Exchanges: a meeting of young people involving a maximum of 40 participants and lasting for around one-week to share ideas and discuss on a particular theme such as environmental protection, equality and democracy, active citizenship, social inclusion, youth entrepreneurship, human rights education, etc.;
 Trainings: one-week long full immersion training activities aimed at improving competencies of youth workers in member organisations; 
 Work camps: field work organised by a member organisation to perform a specific activity on a very local level to foster volunteering and youth work;
 Internships: periods of apprenticeship at one of the two offices open for people willing to explore the inner workings of an INGYO.

Members

References

External links
 YEU International Website
 European Youth Forum member list
 SALTO Youth page
 Publication on NFE adaptation by YEU

European Union youth policy
Youth empowerment organizations
Organizations established in 1986
International organisations based in Belgium
International organizations based in Europe
International educational organizations
Education in Europe